Buldakov is a Russian masculine surname, its feminine counterpart is Buldakova. It may refer to
Aleksey Buldakov (1951–2019), Russian film actor
Igor Buldakov (1930–1979), Russian rower
Lyudmila Buldakova (1938–2006), Russian volleyball player, wife of Igor

Russian-language surnames